Fu Xingguo (born November 1960) is a Chinese politician who served as director of the  from 2016 to 2022.

He was an alternate member of the 19th Central Committee of the Chinese Communist Party.

Biography
Fu was born in Ninghe County (now Ninghe District), Tianjin, in November 1960. He was a sent-down youth between July 1977 and November 1978. After graduating from Ninghe County Normal School in July 1980, he became a teacher at Renfeng Middle School. In 1982, he entered Beijing Normal University, where he majored in education economics.

Fu joined the Chinese Communist Party (CCP) in January 1987.

In December 2011, Fu was admitted to member of the Standing Committee of the CCP Ningxia Hui Autonomous Regional Committee, the region's top authority. He was head of the Organization Department of the CCP Ningxia Hui Autonomous Regional Committee in March 2012, in addition to serving as president of the CCP Ningxia Hui Autonomous Regional Party School.

He was chosen as deputy head of the Organization Department of the CCP Central Committee in July 2018.

References

1960 births
Living people
Beijing Normal University alumni
Renmin University of China alumni
People's Republic of China politicians from Tianjin
Chinese Communist Party politicians from Tianjin
Alternate members of the 19th Central Committee of the Chinese Communist Party